Charles P. Laughlin was a Democratic member of the Pennsylvania House of Representatives. He was born in 1931.

He died of cancer in 1988.

References

1931 births
1988 deaths
Democratic Party members of the Pennsylvania House of Representatives
20th-century American politicians
People from Ambridge, Pennsylvania